The 1875 Boston Red Stockings season was the 5th season of the Boston Red Stockings franchise. They won their 4th consecutive National Association championship.

Managed by Harry Wright, Boston finished with a record of 71–8 to win the pennant by 15 games. Pitcher Al Spalding started 62 of the Red Stockings' games and led the NA with 54 wins. Catcher Deacon White (.367), second baseman Ross Barnes (.364), and first baseman Cal McVey (.355) finished 1–2–3 in the league's batting race. McVey paced the circuit with 87 runs batted in, and outfielder Jim O'Rourke had the most home runs, with 6. The Boston offense scored more runs than any other team in the NA. According to the FiveThirtyEight ELO rating system, they are the greatest team of all time. 

Harry Wright, Al Spalding, Jim O'Rourke, and shortstop George Wright have all been elected into the Baseball Hall of Fame.

This was the last season of the Association, which dissolved at the end of the year. The Red Stockings club would join the new National League in 1876.

Regular season

Season standings

Record vs. opponents

Roster

Player stats

Batting

Starters by position 
Note: Pos = Position; G = Games played; AB = At bats; H = Hits; Avg. = Batting average; HR = Home runs; RBI = Runs batted in

Other batters 
Note: G = Games played; AB = At bats; H = Hits; Avg. = Batting average; HR = Home runs; RBI = Runs batted in

Pitching

Starting pitchers 
Note: G = Games pitched; IP = Innings pitched; W = Wins; L = Losses; ERA = Earned run average; SO = Strikeouts

Relief pitchers 
Note: G = Games pitched; IP = Innings pitched; W = Wins; L = Losses; ERA = Earned run average; SO = Strikeouts

References 

1875 Boston Red Stockings season at Baseball Reference

Boston Red Stockings seasons
Boston Red Stockings
Boston Red Stockings
Boston Red Stockings
19th century in Boston